Ramón Julián Puigblanque (also known as Ramonet, which means little Ramon in Catalan language; born November 9, 1981, in Vic) is a professional Spanish rock climber specializing in lead climbing competitions. He won two World Championships, in 2007 and 2011, three European Championships, in 2004 2010 and 2015, and one Lead Climbing World Cup in 2010. From 2001 to 2016, he participated in 16 seasons of the World Cup, winning 21 World Cup stages.

Biography 
He started climbing when he was a child with his parents and competed in senior categories from 2001. On November 17, 2002, he took his first victory and first podium in the Lead World Cup, in Kranj, last stage of the 2002 season.

On March 8, 2003, he hit the headlines with the first free ascent of La Rambla extension, Siurana, one of the first  in history and the highest grade at that time. In the same year he ended the Lead World Cup in second place with three wins, two seconds and two podiums finishes. The Cup was won by Alexandre Chabot, with five wins and two seconds.

In 2004 he won the gold medal at the European Championships in Lecco, Italy.

On May 29, 2006, he succeeded to onsight the  route Suma O in Cuenca, Spain. Puigblanque became the fourth person ever to have onsighted 8c after Yuji Hirayama, Tomáš Mrázek and Patxi Usobiaga.

In 2007 he took his first gold medal at the World Championships in Avilés, Spain, and ended the Lead World Cup in second place.

In 2010 he won his first Lead World Cup title, with three wins and a second place and took his second gold medal at the European Championships in Imst, Austria.

In 2011 he won his second gold medal at the World Championships in Arco, Italy and ended the Lead World Cup in second place.

On October 11, 2011, he became the third person ever to have onsighted  after Patxi Usobiaga and Adam Ondra, with the onsight of The Crew in Rifle, Colorado, realized a few days after competing in the Boulder stage of the World Cup.

Rankings

Climbing World Cup

Climbing World Championships 
Youth

Adult

Climbing European Championships

Number of medals in the Climbing World Cup

Lead

Notable ascents 
The table below shows the impressively large number of routes graded  or more ascended by Puigblanque in about 16 years, from August 10, 2001 (when he redpointed his first 8a) to November 27, 2017.

Redpointed routes 
:
 Mejorando Imagen - Margalef (ESP) - July 26, 2013 - First ascent. Initially graded 9a, Alex Megos would upgrade the route to 9b after his ascent in April 2021.

:
 Nit de bruixes - Margalef (ESP) - July 1, 2012 - Second ascent (first ascent by Iker Pou)
 Catxasa - Santa Linya (ESP) - June 26, 2012 - Second ascent (first ascent by Chris Sharma, 2011)
 Demencia Senil - Margalef (ESP) - October 11, 2010 - Third ascent (first ascent by Chris Sharma)
 Papichulo - Oliana (ESP) - March 21, 2009 - Third ascent (first ascent by Chris Sharma)
 Directa Open your mind - Santa Linya (ESP) - December 8, 2008 - First ascent
 Realization - Céüse (FRA) - July 28, 2008 - Sixth ascent
 La Rambla - Siurana (ESP) - March 8, 2003 - First ascent of the extended version of the route

:
 San Ku Kaï - Entraygues (FRA) - August 4, 2011
 Le Cadre Nouvelle Version - Céüse (FRA) - August 3, 2011
 Duele la realidad - Oliana (ESP) - November 1, 2010 - First ascent
 Samfaina - Margalef (ESP) - July 4, 2010 - Second ascent (first ascent by Chris Sharma)
 Era Vella - Margalef (ESP) - June 5, 2010 - Second ascent (first ascent by Chris Sharma)
 Supernowa - Vadiello (ESP) - September 12, 2009
 El Gran Bellanco - Montanejos (ESP) - May 1, 2009 - First ascent by Pedro Pons, 2003
 La Novena enmienda - Santa Linya (ESP) - December 9, 2008
 Fabelita r2 - Santa Linya (ESP) - December 9, 2008
 Fuck The system - Santa Linya (ESP) - November 29, 2008
 Victimas Perez - Margalef (ESP) - October 26, 2008 - First ascent
 Gancho perfecto - Margalef (ESP) - July 5, 2008 - Second ascent (first ascent by Chris Sharma)
 El templo del cafe - Alquezar (ESP) - March 24, 2008
 M. ALBA - Savassona (ESP) - December 2, 2007
 Definicion de resistencia democrata - Terradets (ESP) - November 20, 2007
 Esclatamasters -  (ESP) - April 17, 2006 - First ascent
 Estado critico - Siurana (ESP) - March 15, 2004 - First ascent
 KinematiX - Gorges du Loup (FRA) - August 13, 2002

Onsighted routes 
:
 The Crew - Rifle (USA) - October 11, 2011

:
 Amistad - Rodellar (ESP) - September 11, 2009
 Malsoñando - Gandía (ESP) - November 23, 2006
 iron man r2 - Rodellar (ESP) - September 10, 2006
 Suma O - Cuenca (ESP) - May 29, 2006

See also
List of grade milestones in rock climbing
History of rock climbing
Rankings of most career IFSC gold medals

References

External links 

 
 

 Top30climbingwalls profile
 Tenaya profile

Spanish rock climbers
1981 births
Living people
Competitors at the 2013 World Games
Competitors at the 2017 World Games
World Games gold medalists
Competitors at the 2005 World Games
Competitors at the 2009 World Games
IFSC Climbing World Championships medalists
Sportspeople from Vic
IFSC Climbing World Cup overall medalists